The Pakistan Open is a golf tournament organised by the Pakistan Golf Federation that was first played in 1967. In 1989, it was an included on the Asia Golf Circuit, and in 2006, 2007, and 2018 was part of the Asian Tour.

History
Pakistan has a number of golf courses from pre and post-Independence. As the Asian Tour continued to expand, Pakistan was chosen to host a tournament. In 2006, it was part of the Asian Tour schedule for the first time, on an initial three-year deal, however the 2008 Open was postponed due to security concerns within Pakistan at the time the event was scheduled to go ahead.

Chris Rodgers of England won the inaugural event, and in doing so claiming his maiden Asian Tour title. He finished 15 under par, 4 ahead of Indians Jeev Milkha Singh and Amandeep Johl. In 2007 Malaysia’s Airil Rizman claimed his maiden Asian Tour title with a two stroke triumph over Scott Hend of Australia.

In May 2022, it was anticipated that the tournament would return in December 2022 on the Asian Tour as the CNS-Pakistan Open with a record prize fund of US$500,000. However, this never came to fruition.

Winners

Notes

References

Asia Golf Circuit events
Former Asian Tour events
Golf tournaments in Pakistan
Recurring sporting events established in 1967